HMS Hussar was a 28-gun Coventry-class sixth-rate frigate of the Royal Navy.

Construction
The Hussar was one of five frigates of the class built of fir rather than oak. Fir was cheaper and more abundant than oak and permitted noticeably faster construction, but at a cost of a reduced lifespan; the four fir-built Coventry-class vessels that did not get captured lasted an average of only nine years before being struck off.

John Inglis served on the ship as a midshipman in 1758 at the beginning of his career, under his in-law, Captain John Elliot.

See also
List of ships captured in the 18th century

References

 Robert Gardiner, The First Frigates, Conway Maritime Press, London 1992. .
 David Lyon, The Sailing Navy List, Conway Maritime Press, London 1993. .
 Rif Winfield, British Warships in the Age of Sail, 1714 to 1792, Seaforth Publishing, London 2007. .

 

Frigates of the Royal Navy
1757 ships
Ships built in Chatham
Captured ships